The College of Mount Saint Vincent (CMSV) is a private Catholic college in New York City. It was founded in 1847 by the Sisters of Charity of New York.

The college serves over 1,800 students with professional undergraduate programs in nursing, business, communication, and education and graduate degree programs in nursing, business, TESOL and education. It is under the care of the Sisters of Charity of New York, one of several Sisters of Charity congregations of Catholic women that trace their lineage back to Saint Elizabeth Ann Seton.

History

The college was founded in 1847 as the Academy of Mount Saint Vincent, a school for women. It took its name from Saint Vincent de Paul, the 17th-century French priest who worked with the poor and founded the original Sisters of Charity, and from the geographic high point along Fifth Avenue in Manhattan known as McGowan's Pass.

In 1911, the academy became a degree-granting institution and changed its name to the College of Mount Saint Vincent.

Campus buildings

Fonthill Castle
The castle housed the college library from 1942 to 1968. Fonthill once formed the architectural symbol of the college and housed the Office of Admissions and Financial Aid. It was listed on the National Register of Historic Places in 1980. Today, Fonthill is vacated due to damage it has suffered throughout the years.

The Villa
One of the original buildings on site, the Villa (or gardener's cottage) was built of ashlar, sometime prior to 1856 in mid-19th century "bracketed" style.
From 1887 to 1911 the "Stone Cottage" (originally called "Lourdes Villa") housed the St. Aloysius Academy for Boys. Many of the boys attending had sisters who were students at Mt. St. Vincent Academy.  Today the Villa, is the home for several members of Sisters of Charity of New York.

Founders Hall
Founders Hall was built between 1857 and 1859 and subsequently expanded in 1865, 1883, 1906–1908, and in 1951. The original building is a five-story red brick building on a fieldstone base. It features a six-story square tower topped by a copper lantern and spire. The tower is flanked by five story gabled sections.

The Administration Building was listed on National Registrar of Historic Places in 1980.

Today, The Administration Building has been renamed to "Founders Hall" in honor of all those who founded the college.

A fire started in half of Founders Hall in the summer of 2014 and the damage was restored later during the school year.

Maryvale
Maryvale was constructed in 1859; it originally served as a laundry. In 1906 the laundry moved to the newly constructed Rosary Hall and Maryvale housed science classes. In 1954, Science classes moved to the new science building and Maryvale became the Library Annex and Studio Annex. Today, it mainly houses the communications and fine arts departments. Maryvale features a radio studio and a TV studio. The radio shows streams live on livestream. The TV studio is where students film the school's news program, Mount Saint Vincent News.

Lourdes Grotto
In 1873 the Lourdes Grotto was built. It is now considered the oldest outdoor grotto still in existence in the United States. The grotto is situated on a little island in a small lake in an area at one time known as "Lourdes Park".

Le Gras Hall
In 1911, with the opening of a parochial school in Riverdale, Le Gras was remodeled to house the college gymnasium with an auditorium on the second floor. It also housed the commuter students' cafeteria. Today, Le Gras Hall is the headquarters for the Sisters of Charity of New York.

Rosary Hall
Today, several sisters from the Sisters of Charity of New York currently resided in Rosary Hall.

Grace Center

Peter Jay Sharp Athletic and Recreation Center
Opened in 2009, the Sharp Center offers 50,000 square feet of recreational space and houses the college's basketball courts, fitness center, and athletic offices. In 2016, the college placed solar panels on top of the roof of the Sharp Center.

Science Hall
In 2013, the college renovated the building making state of the art.

Elizabeth Seton Library
In 1968, the new Elizabeth Seton Library, or Seton Library, was opened. The library is named after Saint Elizabeth Seton, the first native-born American to be canonized. Elizabeth Seton founded the Sisters of Charity.

Corazon C. Aquino Hall

Opened in 2021, Aquino Hall serves as a residence hall and also houses the Mount's Nursing Program and Physician Assistant Program.

Residence halls
 The corner stone of the Italian Renaissance-style Seton Hall was set by John Cardinal Farley in November 1911.
 In 1962, the cornerstone was laid for Spellman Hall.
 The cornerstone was laid for the Alumnae Hall in 1965.
 Matronardi Hall was built in 2007 and houses over 190 students.

Academics
CMSV is registered by the New York State Education Department, Office of Higher Education, in Albany, New York, and is independently chartered to grant degrees by the Regents of the State of New York.

The student-faculty ratio at CMSV is 13:1.

Athletics
Mount Saint Vincent teams participate as a member of the National Collegiate Athletic Association's Division III. The Dolphins are a member of the Skyline Conference. Men's sports include baseball, basketball, cross country, lacrosse, soccer, volleyball, tennis and wrestling, while women's sports include basketball, cross country, lacrosse, soccer, softball, and volleyball.

Notable alumni
 Corazon Cojuangco-Aquino, President of the Philippines, 1986–1992, first female elected head of state in Philippines; Leader of the first successful non-violent revolution for democracy against dictatorial rule; Laureate of the Eleanor Roosevelt Human Rights Award, United Nations Silver Medal, Prize for Freedom Award, Ramon Magsaysay Award, and Pearl S. Buck Award
 Wendy Craigg, first woman Governor of the Central Bank of the Bahamas
 Noreen Culhane, former Executive Vice President, New York Stock Exchange Euronext, Inc. 
 Gail Dinter-Gottlieb, former president of Acadia University in Wolfville, Nova Scotia
 Aline Griffith, Countess of Romanones, author of The Spy Wore Red
 Bernard McGuirk,  co-host of Bernie and Sid in the Morning and former executive producer of Imus in the Morning
 Miriam Naveira, first Chief Justice on Supreme Court of Puerto Rico
 Desus Nice, former co-host of Viceland's Desus & Mero and current co-host of Showtime's Desus & Mero
 Ethelinda V. Soliven, Filipino journalist and former lifestyle editor of the Manila Bulletin

Notable faculty and staff
 Ron Scapp – educator and author of "Teaching Values" and other works
 Joseph Skelly – author and Bronze Star  recipient; veteran of the current war in Iraq
 Roberto Villanueva – dancer and professor of dance; artistic director of BalaSole Dance Company and recipient of the Distinguished Alumni Award from University of Buffalo

References

External links

 Official website

 
1847 establishments in New York (state)
Educational institutions established in 1847
Henry Engelbert buildings
Riverdale, Bronx
Universities and colleges in New York City
Universities and colleges in the Bronx
Catholic universities and colleges in New York (state)
Former women's universities and colleges in the United States
Association of Catholic Colleges and Universities